Gbalefa Peninsula is an area of land located south of Abeokuta and north of Lagos city. Gbalefa Peninsula was named after Akindele Gbalefa, the outstanding Owu warrior who led the Owu/Egba war against , Ado-Odo and Dahomey.

About Gbalefa Peninsula
The Owu army contingent fought side by side with the Egbas in the Makun, Ilobi and Ado-Odo wars in 1842-45. The Owu/Egba contingent defeated the Ilobi and Ado-Odo at Itori, Yobo, Ifo, Atan and Ota. From these conquered territories the Owu and Egba forces fought against the fierce Dahomey Amazons. There were two major attacks on the Owu/Egba nation by the Dahomeans.

The first, on Monday, March 3, 1851, under the notorious king Ghezo the invading Dahomean army numbered some 15,000 warriors, estimated Eugene Stock (1836-1928), Secretary of the Church Missionary Society. The Owu/Egba forces fiercely defended Abeokuta town within and outside the city walls and won the battle. Had king Ghezo prevailed in his attempt to destroy Abeokuta, historians believe he would have adorned his palace with the polished skulls of Abeokuta kings and influential leaders, just as he had done with kings of every territory he destroyed.

In a bid to avenge Ghezo's defeat, his son and successor, Glele, launched what was supposed to be a surprise attack against Abeokuta in 1863. Owu/Egba allied army intelligence however foretold the impending attack and so the army laid ambushes for the Dahomeans on the outskirts of Abeokuta in the Gbalefa Peninsula. When the Dahomean army marched towards Abeokuta, they were surrounded by the Owu/Egba allied army and defeated in the battle that ensued. The number of casualties, estimated at over 5,000, were described as the worst in the history of West African warfare at the time. The Dahomeans suffered heavy casualties, and Glele's family, horse, coral and golden treasures were also captured by the Owu/Egba allied army.

Lapeleke, Majeogbe and Akinwale were three brothers who fought in the Dahomey war. Lapeleke, a sector commander of the Owu militia in the Egba Allied Forces that checkmated the Dahomean Amazons and other interlopers marauding Abeokuta and the Egba Federation between 1836 and 1843, made Akinale a military base where the militia settled to strategize, hence the footprints of other Owu heroes such as Awaye Sonlu and Akindele Gbalefa, among others, on ground.

In 1937, the colonial government merged Ota and Gbalefa Peninsula under the Egba Native Administration in present day Ogun State, Nigeria.

To underline that Gbelefa Peninsula does not belong to the Aworis/Ottas, a meeting was held on Wednesday, 10 April 1935 at the Olota's Palace between the District Officer from Abeokuta (Representing the resident of Abeokuta Province) and the indigenes of Otta as represented by the Olota of Ota, his chiefs, and the representatives of Ota Bales.

The meeting had been called as a result of a publication in the Akede Eko March 30, 1935, on page 7 Col.2, claiming that Gbelefa Peninsula belonged to the Aworis. The meeting was called by the Resident of Abeokuta Province to ascertain the veracity of the claim from the Aworis living in Otta.

Those in attendance at the meeting were:

1.   The District Officer, Egba -	Capt. J. H. Scott
2.   The Olota of Ota	   -	Salami Oyede
3.   Balogun		           -	Bakare Ajuwon
4.   Bashorun                     -    Olufemi O. Beyioku
5.	Ajana		           -	Daniel Dada
6.	Olukotun	           -    Ogunmuyiwa
7.	Olukosi		           -	Erinle
8.	Akogun		           -	Samuel Oloyede
9.	Ekerin		           -	J. Oshunlabu
10.	Oluwo		           -	Oladimeji Akapo
11.	Apena		           -	Odunfa Odunogun
12.	Asalu		           -	Osu Agbebiyi
13.	Seriki		           -	Alh. Shittu
14.	Balogun of Moslem	   -	Lawani Salako
15.	Oloregan 		   -	T. T. Dada
16.	Balogun of Christians	   -	O. Osuko
17.  Representatives of Ilogbo Community	(1) Salami Oje   (2) Olaifa
18   Representatives of Otas in Onigbongbo Community – Madam Banjoko Oriade

Also present in the meeting were:	

19.  Bale of Atan-Konifewo 	- Isiyemi,
20.  Bale of Obere		- Ogundipe,
21.  Bale of Onibuku		- S. Bankole,
22.  Bale of Imojuba		- Sangotoki.

The minutes of the meeting can be downloaded and read here.

Land disputes
Since early 80s, there has been contention about the ownership of Ilobi and Ado-Odo area. While the Egba claim that Ota people were tenants accommodated by their forebears, having successfully displaced the Ilobi and Ado-Odo during Egba/Dahomey war, the Otta/Awori communities see themselves as original settlers in the area. This ownership disagreement has led to litigants to present their cases before High Court judges in Nigeria.

Historical evidences
Historical records show that the Owu/Egba conquered the contested areas during the Ilobi, Ado-Odo and Dahomey wars of 1836 to 1853. It was documented that Henry Townsend, a British missionary, was present at the ceremonial takeover of the territory by Akindele Gbalefa, the Owu Warrior and head of the Egba allied forces. The Southern part of Gbalefa forest, as it was then called, formerly belonged to the Ados, while the Northern part belonged to the Ilobis. The forest was uninhabited at the time it was conquered.

Historical records also show that it was the Owu/Egba community who allocated farming lands to Ota natives. The Owu/Egba argued that the contested area originally belonged to Ado and Ilobi, and not to Ota, before the conquest. And in a letter written to the then-resident officer of the Abeokuta District by the District Officer of Egba Division entitled "Reorganisation of Ota District", and signed by F.V.O Aribusola in 1937, the District Officer stated that:

Court judgement

High Court
On 18 November 2005 at the High Court of Justice, in the Ota Judicial Division, Ogun State under Justice. H. O. Solanke, the Owu/Egba community was awarded N50,000 and the defendants restrained from committing any further acts of trespass on the said land.
In April 2010, the Abeokuta High Court dismissed the ownership claim by the Ota community.

Appeals Court
In the 1993 Appeal Court judgment at Ibadan delivered by Hon. Justice Owolabi Kolawole in the appeal suit CA/1/129/90. The panel of jurors submitted that "The motion to file and argue additional grounds of appeal can therefore, not be tied to nothing. The motion is dismissed and the appeal is also dismissed as being incomplete with N400 cost to the 1st to 4th respondents."

In April 2010, the latest in the series of legal crossfire in between the two claimants is the subsisting Appeal Court judgment which dismissed the ownership claim by the Ota community. This followed the earlier ruling on the same matter by the Abeokuta High Court.

Coronet Obas (Kings)
In March 2006, The Olowu of Owu, Oba (King) Dr. Olusanya Adegboyega Dosunmu II (Amuroro ruling house) started the appointment of 16 coronets within Owu Kingdom. The appointment/installation of the coronets was met with strong opposition from the Olota of Ota, Oba Alani Osanyintola Oyede who claimed that Oba Olowu of Owu illegally encroached on his territory. The following are the names of the coronet Obas (kings) and their domain:

 Oba Rasheed Adeosun – The Alaga of Aga Olowo
 Oba L.K. Ogunseye – The Onijoko of Ijoko
 Oba Olatunji Oluyomi – The Alatan of Atan-Gbalefa Land
 Oba Edward Fasina – The Alabalabi of Abalabi
 Oba Olufemi Ogunleye – The Towulade of Akinade
 Oba Salisu Abiodun – The Olojodu of Ojodu
 Oba Semiu Sodipo – The Onijagunna of Jagunna
 Oba Isaac Ojelade – The Onibogun of Ibogunlan
 Oba O.O. Akinyemi – The Onifo of Ifo
 Oba B. Osuntogun – The Oniwasinmi of Wasinmi
 Oba Oluwagboun Adebayo – The Onisango of Sango
 Oba Yunusa A. Akinmade – The Olu of Onigbedu
 Oba Fatai Oladipo – The Onilepa of Ilepa
 Oba Alao O. Tepede – The Onikoka of Coker
 Oba Oluwagbemileke A. Babajide – The Alaigbajo of Arigbajo
 Oba Jimoh Famuyiwa – The Onipapa of Papalanto

Community violence
Besides the continued engagement of Owu/Egba community in litigations by the Ota community, there has been reports of unprovoked attacks by people on both sides on their opponents. Lives and livelihoods have been lost. Judgments rendered by the courts have not decreased the incidence of violence in the area.

In the press
July 6, 2010. According to News Star news publication the Olori Igbimo of Owu Kingdom, High Chief Olufemi Sodeinde said the Awori community in Ota have continued to attack the Gbalefa community in an attempt to subdue its people.  "What we expect them to do is to go back to court, if they know they have genuine claim to the land. But they will not. What they want to do is to precipitate a crisis."

References

Landforms of Nigeria
Peninsulas of Africa
Yoruba history
Peninsulas of Yorubaland